"Engel 07" (released as "Angel 07" in English) is a song by German synthpop band Hubert Kah, which was released in 1984 as the lead single from the band's second studio album Golden Zeiten. The song reached No. 30 on the German Singles Chart.

A re-recorded English language version of the song, "Angel 07", was released as a single in 1985. The English lyrics were written by Timothy Touchton. In the US, "Angel 07" was released from the soundtrack of the 1985 American comedy action film Gotcha!.

In 1986, a Japanese version of the song was recorded by Megumi Shiina as "Change Me!"  The Japanese lyrics were written by Hiromi Mori.

Promotion
On German TV, the band performed the song on Na sowas! on 9 May 1984, Der Spielbude on 9 August 1984, and ZDF-Hitparade on 17 January 1985. A music video was filmed to promote the English version of the song. It was directed by Pete Cornish.

Critical reception
Upon its release, Cash Box listed the single as one of their "feature picks" during June 1985. They commented: "Hubert Kah scores with a sheen-pop outing reminiscent of fellow German, Peter Schilling. A good international feel, a perfect record for summertime CHR."

Track listing

1984 release
7" single
"Engel 07" - 3:43
"Rhythmus À Gogo" - 3:20

12" single
"Engel 07" - 5:07
"Rhythmus À Gogo" - 3:20

1985 release
7" single (Italian release)
"Angel 07" (Edited Version) - 3:54
"Solo Tu" - 3:42

7" single (Australian release)
"Angel 07" (Edited Version) - 3:54
"Engel 07" (German Version) - 4:02

7" single (Japanese release)
"Angel 07" (Edited Version) - 3:54
"Angel 07" (Extended Version) - 6:10

12" single (US release)
"Angel 07" (Extended Version) - 6:10
"Angel 07" (Edited Version) - 3:54
"Angel 07" (Rock Remix) - 4:18
"Angel 07" (Alternative Remix) - 6:54

12" single (Australian release)
"Angel 07" (Extended Version) - 6:10
"Angel 07" (Edited) - 3:54
"Engel 07" (German Version) - 4:02
"Angel 07" (Alternative Remix) - 6:54

Personnel
Hubert Kah
 Hubert Kemmler – vocals, keyboards
 Markus Löhr – guitar, keyboards
 Klaus Hirschburger – bass

Production
 Michael Cretu – producer, arranger
  – producer
 David Leonard – remixer and engineer on "Rock Remix"
 Victor Flores – remixer on "Alternative Remix"
 David Storrs – remix engineer on "Alternative Remix"

Other
 Mike Schmidt at Ink Studios – cover (1984 release)
 Sheila Rock – photography (1984 release)

Charts

References

1984 songs
1984 singles
1985 singles
MCA Records singles
Curb Records singles
Song recordings produced by Michael Cretu